Natalie Obkircher (born 7 February 1971 in Geldern) is an Italian luger who competed between 1990 and 2003. She won five medals in the mixed team event at the FIL World Luge Championships with one silver (1995) and four bronzes (1991, 1993, 1996, 1997).

At the FIL European Luge Championships, Obkircher won six medals in the mixed team event with a gold in 1994, a silver in 1998 and a bronze in 1990, 1992, 1996 and 2000.

Competing in four Winter Olympics, Obkircher earned her best finish of fifth in the women's singles event at Lillehammer in 1994.

References
1992 luge women's singles results
1994 luge women's singles results
1998 luge women's singles results
2002 luge women's singles results
1998 profile on Obkircher
2002 results for Obkircher
FIL-Luge profile
Hickok sports information on World champions in luge and skeleton.
List of European luge champions

External links
 

1971 births
Living people
Italian lugers
Italian female lugers
Olympic lugers of Italy
Lugers at the 1992 Winter Olympics
Lugers at the 1994 Winter Olympics
Lugers at the 1998 Winter Olympics
Lugers at the 2002 Winter Olympics
People from Welschnofen
Germanophone Italian people
Sportspeople from Südtirol